Dui Poishar Alta (English: Cheap Alta) is a 1982 Bangladeshi film starring Razzak and Shabana opposite him. She garnered Bangladesh National Film Award for Best Actress for her performance in the film. It also stars Nutan and Anwara.

Cast 
 Shabana
 Razzak
 Nutan (actress)
 Anwara

Track listing 
"Ei Duniya Ekhon To Aar" - Mitali Mukherjee
"Ami Hobo Por" - Runa Laila
"Eto Beshi Bolis Na" - Runa Laila
Kiba Jadu Jano" - Aladdin Ali
"Emonoto Prem Hoy" - Syed Abdul Hadi

Awards 
Bangladesh National Film Awards
Best Actress - Shabana
Best Female Playback Singer - Mitali Mukherjee
Best Editing - Awkat Hossain
Best Cinematographer - Rafiqul Bari Chowdhury

References

1982 films
Bengali-language Bangladeshi films
Films scored by Alauddin Ali
1980s Bengali-language films